Natalie Marie Murray (née, LaRe; born December 28, 1983) is an American singer and songwriter from Nashville, Tennessee.  She has released four studio albums with her band LaRue, formed by her brother Phillip and herself, and an EP as solo artist.

Early life
Natalie Marie LaRue, now Murray, was born on December 28, 1983, the daughter of Paul William LaRue and Carolynn Marie LaRue (née, Nesbitt). Her elder brother is Phillip LaRue, and she has two younger twin sisters.

LaRue 
Ever since she started singing in church choirs at an early age, Natalie has had a passion to sing. At the age of 11, she teamed up with her brother, Phillip, to write their first song while he was bed-ridden by mononucleosis.

At 14, she and Phillip were signed as a duo to Reunion Records under the Provident Music Group. Their debut album, LaRue, was released in 2000 including 11 original tracks they had co-written. They became popular in the CCM scene. Songs such as the softhearted and memorable "Someday", written to Natalie's future husband and Phillip's future wife, and "Reason", a statement of faith amidst doubts established LaRue as beyond their age in talent and maturity.

In 2001, they released their second album Transparent. Also with all songs written by the two siblings, but with brand new themes and an edgier, rock-influenced sound.  From the alternative/pop "Jaded", about changing relationships, to the electro ballad "Fallen For You", a love song to God, to the soft and melodious "Brianna's Song", a moving song written about their sister with cerebral palsy. The album confirmed LaRue's place among top CCM performers.

In 2002, aged of 17, she and Phillip, 19, finished their third album, Reaching, and received great reviews for its sophisticated harmonies, matured lyrics and fuller alternative rock feel. Reaching had several stand out tracks as the siblings' musical talent and lyrical honesty reflected their artistic maturation. The album's catchy pop title track reflected LaRue's passionate worship to God. Likewise, Natalie's vocals soared over the strong beat and guitars of "Tonight", about being committed to God. Other songs like "Ok to Cry", about grieving amidst hope, and "Summertime", about longing for a soul mate, openly addressed teen issues in the light of Christian faith. Critics said the album was "amazing" and put it among the 2002 best CCM albums.

Personal life 
In 2003, Natalie married Rob Murray, a performer from South Africa whom she had met while playing the same music festival the prior year.

Then, in 2003, Natalie and Phillip ended their musical duo. Just five years after starting off they had been touring internationally, sharing the stage with Rebecca St. James, Bebo Norman, Amy Grant and Michael W. Smith, selling over half a million records and making many chart-toppers.
 
Soon after getting married in 2003, Natalie and her husband welcomed their first son Noah. Later they had three daughters, Ella, Viola, and Adia.

Back to music 
In April 2012, after several years focused on being a full-time parent, she released the EP Even Now, produced by Don Chaffer from Waterdeep.

Discography

As LaRue

As solo artist

References 

1983 births
Living people
American singer-songwriters
American performers of Christian music
21st-century American singers